Jan-Chris de Koeijer or Jan Chris de Koeyer (born 20 October 1966, Yerseke) is a Dutch bass player and singer. He is best known for his position in Gorefest. He also co-founded the band.

He provided vocals for Ayreon's 1995 debut album, The Final Experiment.

After the disbandment, De Koeyer focused on a studio project called ColdPopCulture, together with Iljan Mol.

In 2004, he took part in the re-united Gorefest.

In 2006, he appeared at EPICA's concert in Paradiso (Amsterdam) as a guest grunter on the song Consign to Oblivion (A New Age Dawns #3).

References 

1966 births
Living people
Dutch heavy metal bass guitarists
Dutch heavy metal singers
People from Reimerswaal
Gorefest members